Diana Janet McQueen  (born June 7, 1961) is a Canadian politician, who was elected in the 2008 provincial election to represent the electoral district of Drayton Valley-Calmar in the Legislative Assembly of Alberta as a member of the Progressive Conservative caucus. She served in several cabinet positions from 2011 to 2015.

After Alison Redford won the 2011 Progressive Conservative Leadership Convention, McQueen was sworn in during the final session of the 27th Alberta Legislative Assembly as the Alberta Minister of Environment and Water. The Ministry of Environment and Water (Alberta) was created to consolidate the Ministry of Environment & Water and the Ministry of Sustainable Resource Development announced on May 8, 2012. In December 2013, she was moved from the environment portfolio and became Minister of Energy. When Jim Prentice became premier in September 2014, McQueen was appointed Minister of Municipal Affairs; in March 2015 she was given the additional responsibility of being in charge of the province's response to climate change.

McQueen was defeated in the 2015 provincial election that also defeated Prentice's government.

Prior to standing in the provincial election, McQueen was mayor of Drayton Valley from 2001 to 2008.

Electoral record

References

External links
 Diana McQueen

|-

Progressive Conservative Association of Alberta MLAs
Women MLAs in Alberta
Living people
Mayors of places in Alberta
Women mayors of places in Alberta
1961 births
Members of the Executive Council of Alberta
21st-century Canadian politicians
21st-century Canadian women politicians
Women government ministers of Canada